"Kickstart My Heart" is a song by American heavy metal band Mötley Crüe, originally released on their 1989 album, Dr. Feelgood. Released as the album's second single in 1989, "Kickstart My Heart" reached #27 on the Billboard Hot 100 chart in the United States in early 1990. The track has been used in various media, such as the US version of the 2001 racing video game Gran Turismo 3: A-spec, and was also included on the soundtrack album to the 2019 biographical film The Dirt and the official trailer of Battlefield 2042 remixed by 2WEI.

Background
In a 2015 interview, Mötley Crüe bassist Nikki Sixx related the origins of "Kickstart My Heart", which he wrote while the band was already working on Dr. Feelgood. Sixx was playing acoustic guitar in his house while scribbling words on a piece of paper. When the group’s former manager read the words, he encouraged Sixx to share it with the rest of the band. Sixx was reluctant, but eventually did show the band and the track came together quickly. The phrase "kickstart my heart" supposedly refers to Sixx's overdose incident where a paramedic injected his heart with adrenaline; Guns N' Roses drummer Steven Adler disputes the accuracy of the story, saying he revived Sixx before the paramedics arrived. The introduction is a classic example of a Floyd Rose bridge trick, in which Mick Mars drops three consecutive strings resulting in sound similar to a motorcycle shifting gears. The song's ending features a prominent example of talkbox effects.

Music video

1989 video
The video clip was shot at the Whisky a Go Go on October 5, 1989, during Mötley Crüe's warm-up show before embarking on the Dr. Feelgood world tour. Sam Kinison is featured at the start of the video chauffeuring the band to the Whisky in a 1946 Buick ambulance.

As part of their cross-promotion with the Mötley Crüe Final Tour and to celebrate the song's 25th anniversary in 2014, Dodge remixed the music video, replacing some of the action scenes with footage of Dodge's performance cars on the track.

2011 video
In 2011 Mötley Crüe made a new video for the song which included multiple clips from their U.S. tour with Poison and New York Dolls. Soon after the band issued the following statement: "We documented the whole tour, top to bottom (the good, the bad and the ugly) and as we were looking through all the amazing footage, we thought how cool it would be to cut together a 'best of visual' for the fans who made this tour happen. This one is just for the fans, from us."

In other media 
"Kickstart My Heart" appeared in the opening montage of Hockey Night in Canadas coverage of Game 1 of the second round series of the 2022 Stanley Cup Playoffs between the Edmonton Oilers and the Calgary Flames, whose games against each other are a rivalry known as the "Battle of Alberta". Many clips in the montage showed highlights of the two teams' games from the 1980s, as the song was released in the 1980s and the rivalry was at its fever pitch during that span.

Personnel
 Vince Neil – vocals
 Mick Mars – guitars
 Nikki Sixx – bass
 Tommy Lee – drums

Charts

Certifications

References

External links

1989 singles
Elektra Records singles
Mötley Crüe songs
Songs based on actual events
Songs written by Nikki Sixx
1989 songs
Music videos directed by Wayne Isham
Song recordings produced by Bob Rock